Micromyrtus stenocalyx is a plant species of the family Myrtaceae endemic to Western Australia.

It blooms between April and December producing white flowers.

It is found on undulating sand plains and sand dunes in the Goldfields-Esperance region of Western Australia to the east of Kalgoorlie where it grows in sandy soils.

References

stenocalyx
Flora of Western Australia
Plants described in 1980
Taxa named by Ferdinand von Mueller